Theophilus Riesinger, O.F.M. Cap., also known as Francis Xavier Riesinger (February 27, 1868 - November 9, 1941) was a German-American Capuchin friar and Catholic priest, who became widely known as an exorcist in the United States.

Life
Riesinger was born in Germany. He later moved to the United States where he entered the Capuchin Order. He was ordained on 29 June 1899. In the summer of 1928, due to his previous experience in dealing with possessions, he was requested by the Bishop of Des Moines to conduct the rite of exorcism on a Anna Ecklund a 46-year-old woman who was suspected of being possessed. While preaching at a parish mission in St. Joseph Parish in Earling, Iowa, he asked the permission of the pastor to conduct the ceremony in the parish. Receiving this, he chose a convent of Franciscan Sisters on the outskirts of the town for its privacy.

After 23 days of performing the exorcism, Riesinger was exhausted. Two days before Christmas of that year, he claimed the demons were driven out, and the woman cried "My Jesus! Mercy! Praised be Jesus Christ!"

The case became famous worldwide and was written about in Germany by the Rev. Carl Vogl. This article was translated into English in 1935 by a Benedictine monk of Saint John's Abbey in Minnesota, Celestine Kapsner as Begone Satan. Riesinger wrote about the case in a 1934 book titled The Earling possession case: An exposition of the exorcism of 'Mary', a demoniac.  Another book about the case is The Devil Rocked Her Cradle by David St. Clair (Dell, 1987).

Riesinger died on November 9, 1941. A necrology of Riesinger was placed on the Internet as part of the Capuchin Heritage Series.

References

External links
Roman Catholic Books

1868 births
1941 deaths
German emigrants to the United States
Capuchins
People from Marathon, Wisconsin
20th-century American Roman Catholic priests
Catholic exorcists
Writers from Wisconsin
Burials in Wisconsin
Catholics from Wisconsin
American exorcists
German exorcists